Anne Zink is a French historian and honorary professor of modern history. A student of Pierre Goubert, she specializes in the history of the Ancien Régime.

Biography 
She is the daughter of the poet  and Marthe Cohn. Her brother is writer Michel Zink and her sister is mathematician Odile Favaron. Anne Zink was a student at the École normale supérieure de Sèvres, studying history and geography, receiving a third-cycle doctorate in 1965 and a State doctorate in 1985.

Career 
She was an assistant professor at the Université de Paris X-Nanterre. She was named professor of modern history at the université Clermont-Ferrand-II.

Her works in social history are based on extensive archival research, reconstructing the lives of small communities. She has become one of the foremost experts on rural life in southwestern France under the Ancien Régime. Her research takes place at the École des Hautes études en sciences sociales (EHESS) in Paris. Her work is situated at the crossroads of history, geography, ethnology, and law. She has made several studies of the history of Sephardic Judaism in France, particularly in the southwest.

Publications 
 Azereix. La vie d'une communauté rurale à la fin du XVIIIe siècle, Paris : S.E.V.P.E.N., 1969.
 Pays et paysans gascons sous l'ancien régime, Lille 3 : ANRT, 1987.
 L'Héritier de la maison : Géographie coutumière du Sud-ouest de la France, Paris : Éditions de l'ÉHESS, 1993. .
 Clochers et troupeaux : Les communautés rurales des Landes et du Sud-ouest de la France avant la Révolution, Talence : Presses universitaires de Bordeaux, 1997. .
 Pays ou circonscriptions : Les collectivités territoriales de la France du Sud-Ouest, Paris : Publications de la Sorbonne, 2000. .
 She has also published numerous articles which have been compiled in works such as:
 Études réunies en l'honneur de Pierre Goubert, Toulouse, 1984
 Mélanges en l'honneur de Robert Mandrou, Paris, 1985

References 

20th-century French historians
French women historians
Academic staff of Paris Nanterre University
Academic staff of Blaise Pascal University
Year of birth missing (living people)
20th-century French women writers
Living people